Taneti Vanitha is an Indian politician, Minister of Home Affairs, Prison, Fire Services and Disaster Management in the Government of Andhra Pradesh and a Member of Andhra Pradesh Legislative Assembly from Kovvur, West Godavari district. She got majority of about 25000 votes in the 2019 Indian general election. She is currently serving as the Minister of Home, Prisons, Fire Services of Andhra Pradesh since 2022. 
She came out of Telugu Desam Party due to TDP's stand on Andhra Pradesh bifurcation and then joined YSR Congress Party and contested from Kovvuru.

Career
She was elected as MLA for Gopalapuram on TDP ticket but defected to YSR Congress party in November 2012. In 2019 she contested from Kovvuru as MLA and won with a majority of 25000 votes and appointed as Minister of Women and Child Welfare Department in Y. S. Jagan Mohan Reddy ministry. In April 2022 Cabinet reshuffle Vanitha appointed as Minister for Home and Disaster Management.

References

Living people
Women members of the Andhra Pradesh Legislative Assembly
Andhra Pradesh MLAs 2009–2014
People from West Godavari district
21st-century Indian women politicians
Andhra Pradesh MLAs 2019–2024
State cabinet ministers of Andhra Pradesh
1971 births